Charles Kemp may refer to:

Charles Kemp (politician) (1813–1864), Australian politician
Charles Kemp (English cricketer) (1856–1933), English first-class cricketer
Charles Kemp (Australian cricketer) (1864–1940), Australian first-class cricketer
Charles Denton Kemp (1911–1993), Australian economist and economic policy commentator
Charles Eamer Kempe (1837–1907), English designer and manufacturer of stained glass